Get It Poppin' may refer to:

 "Get It Poppin (Fat Joe song) (2005), a song featuring Nelly
 "Get It Poppin, a song by JoJo from The High Road (2006)